The Day Will Come is an album by English jazz pianist Howard Riley, which was recorded and released on CBS in 1970, and reissued on CD by Columbia in 1999. It features his working trio of that period, with bassist Barry Guy and drummer Alan Jackson.

Reception

The Penguin Guide to Jazz awarded the record one of its rare crown accolades and notes that "the introduction of Barry Guy as co-composer is the key factor in our very high rating for this record. It is he who balances the rather tender and melancholic cast of Riley's playing."

In a review for Record Collector, Ian McCann stated that, in relation to Angle, recorded the previous year, The Day Will Come "boasts one of the great baffling sleeves of its era, but has more musical clarity: witness the pensive 'Sad Was the Song' and 'Winter'. There's less urgency here – perhaps time has given the threesome the understanding to not have to try so hard – and it's by far the better album."

Track listing
All compositions by Howard Riley except as indicated
 "Sphere" – 5:10
 "Sad Was the Song" (Barry Guy) – 4:20
 "Winter" – 4:15
 "Dawn Vision" (Barry Guy) – 5:39
 "Funeral Song" – 8:27
 "Playtime" (Barry Guy) – 6:00
 "Eclipse" – 6:05
 "Deeper" – 5:10
 "Games" (Barry Guy) – 5:00
 "Score" – 1:54
 "High" (Barry Guy) – 5:40
 "The Day Will Come" (Barry Guy) – 3:47

Personnel
Howard Riley – piano
Barry Guy – bass 
Alan Jackson – drums

References

1970 albums
Howard Riley (musician) albums
CBS Records albums